The 1932 Tennessee gubernatorial election was held on November 8, 1932. Democratic nominee Hill McAlister defeated Republican nominee John McCall with 42.75% of the vote.

Primary elections
Primary elections were held on August 4, 1932.

Democratic primary

Candidates
Hill McAlister, Tennessee State Treasurer
Lewis S. Pope
Malcolm R. Patterson, former Governor
Rufus Campbell

Results

General election

Candidates
Major party candidates
Hill McAlister, Democratic
John McCall, Republican

Other candidates
Lewis S. Pope, Independent
John H. Compton, Independent
Charles R. Marlow, Independent

Results

References

1932
Tennessee
Gubernatorial